Sardinella rouxi (yellowtail sardinella) is a species of ray-finned fish in the genus Sardinella.

Footnotes 
 

rouxi
Fish described in 1953